This is a list of articles on general management and strategic management topics. For articles on specific areas of management, such as marketing management, production management, human resource management, information technology management, and international trade, see the list of related topics at the bottom of this page.
 Management an overview
 Balanced scorecard
 Benchmarking
 Business intelligence
 Industrial espionage
 Environmental scanning
 Marketing research
 Competitor analysis
 Reverse engineering
 Operations
 Popular management theories : a critique
 Centralisation
 Change management
 Communications management
 Conjoint analysis
 Constraint Management
 Focused improvement
 Corporate governance
 Corporation
 Board of directors
 Middle management
 Senior management
 Corporate titles
 Cross ownership
 Community management
 Corporate image
 Cost management
 Spend management
 Procurement
 Crisis management
 Critical management studies
 Cultural intelligence
 Decentralisation
 Design management
 Diagnostic Enterprise Method
 Engineering Management
 Enterprise content management
 Content management system
 Web content management system
 Document management system
 Contract management
 Fixed assets management
 Records Management
 Enterprise legal management
 Event management
 Extended Enterprise
 Facility management
 Force field analysis
 Fraud deterrence
 Human Interaction Management
 Information technology management (MIS)
 Knowledge management
 Organizational development
 Overall Equipment Effectiveness
 Management effectiveness
 Management fad
 Management information systems
 Management of Technology (MOT)
 Midsourcing
 Peter Drucker's Management by objectives (MBO)
 Management consulting
 Management science and operations research
 Manufacturing
 Just In Time manufacturing
 Lean manufacturing
 News management
 Planning
 Planning fallacy
 Professional institutions in management
 Quality management
 Value-based management
 Volatility, uncertainty, complexity and ambiguity
 Project management
 Risk management

Timelines 
 Timeline of management techniques

Management topics
Management topics